Caleb Aperahama (born 11 July 1996 in New Zealand) is a New Zealand rugby union player who plays for  in the National Provincial Championship. His playing position is lock.

Reference list

External links
itsrugby.co.uk profile

1996 births
New Zealand rugby union players
Living people
Rugby union locks
Rugby union flankers
Canterbury rugby union players
Southland rugby union players